Milind Usha Soman (born 4 November 1965) is an Indian actor, supermodel, film producer, and fitness enthusiast. He was a contestant on  Fear Factor: Khatron Ke Khiladi 3.

Early and personal life 
Soman was born on 4 November 1965 in Glasgow, Scotland in a Marathi family. His family moved to Scotland/UK where he lived until the age of seven, then his family moved back to Mumbai, India in 1973. He attended Dr. Antonio Da Silva High School and Jr. College of Commerce, Bombay. 

As a child Soman was enrolled in a Rashtriya Swayamsevak Sangh(RSS) shakha by his father, when he was 10 years old. Later, he completed his Diploma in Electrical Engineering.

Milind Soman met Mylene Jampanoi, a French actress, on the sets of their 2006 film, Valley of Flowers. The couple married in July 2006 at a resort in Goa. Soman and Jampanoi separated in 2008 and divorced in 2009.

Soman married Ankita Konwar on 22 April 2018 in Alibaug.

Career 

In 1995, Soman got featured in Alisha Chinai's music video, Made in India. The same year, he made his debut as a television actor in A Mouthful of Sky. Later, he was seen in the Indian science fiction TV Series Captain Vyom
and also played part in the TV series Sea Hawks. Soman has worked in films such as Pachaikili Muthucharam, Paiyaa, Agni Varsha and Rules: Pyaar Ka Superhit Formula. In 2007 he appeared in Bhram, Say Salaam India and Bheja Fry. In 2009 he acted in Sachin Kundalkar's Marathi film Gandha. He has also acted in English language, foreign language films and television series, including Valley of Flowers and The Flag. In the Swedish film Arn – The Knight Templar he portrayed Saladin, the revered 12th-century Kurdish leader of the Arabs and Muslims. He was also seen playing an important role in the film Bajirao Mastani.

Soman has also produced Hindi film Rules: Pyaar Ka Superhit Formula  and television serial Ghost Bana Dost.

In 2010, he participated in the reality show Fear Factor: Khatron Ke Khiladi 3. He was also seen in Amazon Prime series Four More Shots Please as Dr. Aamir Warsi and Alt Balaji series Paurashpur as Boris.

Sports 

He started swimming at age of 6. He has represented Maharashtra at the age of 10 in various age groups before going on to represent his state at the senior level. Soman represented India in swimming in the inaugural South Asian Games (then known as South Asian Federation Games) in 1984 held at Kathmandu where he won a Silver medal.  In 2015, Milind completed the Ironman challenge in 15 hours and 19 minutes , in his first try.

Public image 
In 1995, Milind Soman and his then-girlfriend, Madhu Sapre, an ex-Miss India and model attracted controversy in India, when the pair posed nude in a print ad for Tuffs Shoes. The social service branch of the Mumbai police had registered a case in August 1995 after Sapre and Soman posed in the nude, wearing only shoes and a python wrapped around them. Another case was filed under the Wildlife Protection Act against the advertising agency for illegal use of the python. The accused include the publishers and distributors of two magazines that featured the controversial ad, the advertising agency, the two models, and the photographers. The case dragged on for 14 years, after which the courts acquitted the accused.

On his 55th birthday in 2020, Soman shared a picture of himself running in the nude on a beach in Goa. The incident led to the creation of many Internet memes featuring the picture.

He has also starred in a controversial ad for Vim, promoting dishwashing liquid for men.

Filmography

Films

Television

Music videos

References

External links 

 
 

1965 births
Living people
Indian male film actors
Male actors from Glasgow
Indian male models
Marathi people
Fear Factor: Khatron Ke Khiladi participants